R-Type is a science-fiction horizontal-scrolling shooter video game franchise developed and published by Irem for arcade systems and home game platforms. The first entry in the series was released in 1987, R-Type, followed by several sequels for other platforms. Ten games in total have been released in the series. Other pieces of media, such as plastic-resin model kits, soundtrack albums and literature, were also produced. The series centers on an intergalactic war between humans and the Bydo, a powerful extraterrestrial race that are made from both biological lifeforms and mechanical structures. Most games have the player controlling the R-9 "Arrowhead" star vessel, although other entries have slightly altered versions of the ship instead.

R-Type video games have been released for multiple home video game consoles, as well as personal computers, handheld systems and mobile phones. Several games in the series were also released for digital distribution services, such as Xbox Live Arcade, alongside dedicated compilation games for other systems. Most entries are horizontal-scrolling shooter games, although a number have expanded into other genres, such as tactical role-playing games. The R-Type series is considered one of the most important video game franchises established in the 1980s; the original is also cited as one of the greatest video games ever made.

List of games

Main series

Spin-off games

Compilations

References

External links
 R-Type Dimensions official site

1998 video games
Game Boy Color games
PlayStation (console) games
PlayStation Network games
R-Type
Xbox 360 Live Arcade games
Irem games
Video games developed in Japan
R-Type